The men's 1500 metres was a track and field athletics event held as part of the Athletics at the 1904 Summer Olympics program. It was the third time the event was held. 9 runners from 3 nations participated. The competition was held on September 3, 1904. The event was won by Jim Lightbody of the United States, completing his 1904 treble (800 metres, 1500 metres, and 2590 metres steeplechase). It was the first championship in the event for the United States. The Americans, with 7 of the 9 runners, swept the medals.

Background

This was the third appearance of the event, which is one of 12 athletics events to have been held at every Summer Olympics. None of the runners from 1900 returned. The field again was fairly undistinguished; 1903 and 1904 AAA champion Alfred Shrubb of Great Britain and multiple AAU one-mile champion Alexander Grant of the United States did not compete. David Curtiss Munson, the 1904 AAU champion, was the favorite going into the Games, though Jim Lightbody's victories in the 800 metres and 2590 metres steeplechase made him a likely contender.

Canada made its first appearance in the event. The United States made its third appearance, the only nation to have also previously competed in 1896 and 1900.

Competition format

The competition consisted of a single round.

The track was a cinder track 1/3 mile in length with one long straightaway.

Records

These were the standing world and Olympic records prior to the 1904 Summer Olympics.

Jim Lightbody set a new Olympic record and a new unofficial world record at 4:05.4.

Schedule

Results

References

Sources
 

Athletics at the 1904 Summer Olympics
1500 metres at the Olympics